Juan Ramon Sánchez (born December 22, 1955) is the Chief United States district judge of the United States District Court for the Eastern District of Pennsylvania.

Education and career 
Born in Vega Baja, Puerto Rico, Sánchez received a Bachelor of Arts degree from City College of New York in 1978 and a Juris Doctor from the University of Pennsylvania Law School in 1981. He was a Staff attorney of Legal Aid of Chester County, Pennsylvania, from 1981 to 1983. He was in private practice in West Chester, Pennsylvania, from 1983 to 1984, and was then an attorney for the County of Chester Public Defender's Office from 1984 to 1997. He was a judge on the Court of Common Pleas for Chester County from 1998 to 2004.

Federal judicial service 
On November 25, 2003, Sánchez was nominated by President George W. Bush to a seat on the United States District Court for the Eastern District of Pennsylvania vacated by Jay Waldman. Sánchez was confirmed by the United States Senate on June 23, 2004, and received his commission on June 24, 2004.

On August 1, 2018, Sánchez became the first Latino chief judge of the Eastern District of Pennsylvania, due to the announced retirement of Lawrence F. Stengel.

See also 
 List of Hispanic/Latino American jurists
 List of first minority male lawyers and judges in Pennsylvania

References

External links 
 

|-

1955 births
Living people
20th-century American lawyers
20th-century American judges
21st-century American lawyers
21st-century American judges
Hispanic and Latino American judges
Judges of the Pennsylvania Courts of Common Pleas
Judges of the United States District Court for the Eastern District of Pennsylvania
Pennsylvania lawyers
People from Vega Baja, Puerto Rico
Public defenders
United States district court judges appointed by George W. Bush
University of Pennsylvania Law School alumni